The East Main Street Residential Historic District in Lumpkin, Georgia is a  historic district which was listed on the National Register of Historic Places in 1982.  The listing included five contributing buildings.

The district includes buildings on East Main Street near Elm Street.  It includes a Plantation Plain-style cottage, two Victorian cottages, and a Queen Anne-style house.

References

Historic districts on the National Register of Historic Places in Georgia (U.S. state)
National Register of Historic Places in Stewart County, Georgia
Victorian architecture in Georgia (U.S. state)
Queen Anne architecture in Georgia (U.S. state)